2013 Tucapel, provisional designation , is an eccentric Florian asteroid from the inner regions of the asteroid belt, approximately 11 kilometers in diameter. It was discovered on 22 October 1971, by the University of Chile's National Astronomical Observatory at Cerro El Roble Astronomical Station. It was named for one of the indigenous Mapuche chiefs.

Orbit and classification 

Tucapel is a member of the Flora family, one of the largest groups of stony asteroids. It orbits the Sun in the inner main-belt at a distance of 1.8–2.8 AU once every 3 years and 6 months (1,265 days). Its orbit has an eccentricity of 0.23 and an inclination of 8° with respect to the ecliptic.

Physical characteristics 

Tucapel has been characterized as a common S-type asteroid.

Rotation period 

In October 2009, a rotational lightcurve of Tucapel was obtained from photometric observations at the Oakley Southern Sky Observatory in Australia. Lightcurve analysis gave a well-defined rotation period of 9.028 hours with a brightness variation of 0.34 magnitude.

Diameter and albedo 

According to the surveys carried out by the Japanese Akari satellite and NASA's Wide-field Infrared Survey Explorer with its subsequent NEOWISE mission, Tucapel measures between 10.61 and 12.685 kilometers in diameter and its surface has an albedo between 0.1003 and 0.328. The Collaborative Asteroid Lightcurve Link assumes an albedo of 0.24 — derived from 8 Flora, the family's largest member and namesake – and calculates a diameter of 11.84 kilometers with an absolute magnitude of 11.8.

Naming 

This minor planet was named for one of the brave chiefs of the Mapuche, indigenous inhabitants of south-central Chile and southwestern Argentina, who, with his wife Gualeva, victoriously entered the city of Imperial. He died in 1560, fighting against the colonial Spaniards (also see Arauco War, Battle of Tucapel and Lautaro). The official naming citation was published by the Minor Planet Center on 1 June 1980.

References

External links 
 Asteroid Lightcurve Database (LCDB), query form (info )
 Dictionary of Minor Planet Names, Google books
 Asteroids and comets rotation curves, CdR – Observatoire de Genève, Raoul Behrend
 Discovery Circumstances: Numbered Minor Planets (1)-(5000) – Minor Planet Center
 
 

002013
002013
Named minor planets
19711022